The Wizard of Oz is a 2011 musical based on the 1939 film of the same name in turn based on L. Frank Baum's novel The Wonderful Wizard of Oz, with a book adapted by Andrew Lloyd Webber and Jeremy Sams.  The musical uses the Harold Arlen and E. Y. Harburg songs from the film and includes some new songs and additional music by Lloyd Webber and additional lyrics by Tim Rice. It is the third stage musical adaptation of the film following the 1945 version for the St. Louis Municipal Opera (The Muny) and the 1987 version for the Royal Shakespeare Company.

After previews in the West End from 7 February, the musical opened on 1 March 2011, directed by Jeremy Sams, and closed on 2 September 2012.  The original cast included Danielle Hope as Dorothy Gale, Michael Crawford as the Wizard and Hannah Waddingham as the Wicked Witch of the West. Sophie Evans played Dorothy on Tuesday evenings and took over the role full-time in February 2012.  The role of Dorothy was cast through the 2010 reality television show Over the Rainbow, in which Hope won and Evans was the runner-up.  After a similar Canadian reality TV search show, a Toronto production (starring Danielle Wade as Dorothy) began in December 2012 and closed in August 2013, and was followed by a North American tour. In April 2017 an Australian tour was announced including season at the Lyric Theatre, Queensland Performing Arts Centre, the Capitol Theatre in Sydney, and at the Adelaide Festival Theatre. The cast includes Anthony Warlow as the Wizard, with Lucy Durack as Glinda the Good Witch and Jemma Rix as Wicked Witch of the West.

Background
The Wizard of Oz was first turned into a musical extravaganza by Baum himself. A loose adaptation of his 1900 novel (there is no Wicked Witch or Toto, and there are some new characters), it first played in Chicago in 1902 and was a success on Broadway the following year. It then toured for nine years. The 1939 film adaptation bore a closer resemblance to the storyline of Baum's original novel than most previous versions. It was a strong success, winning the Academy Awards for Best Original Song and Original Score, and continues to be broadcast perennially.

Among the many musical theatre adaptations of The Wizard of Oz, two previous ones have used the songs from the film. In 1945, the St. Louis Municipal Opera (MUNY) created a version with a script adapted by Frank Gabrielson from the novel, but it is influenced in some respects by the motion picture screenplay. It uses most of the songs from the film. This was followed, in 1987, by a Royal Shakespeare Company (RSC) adaptation designed to more closely recreate the film version. The book by John Kane closely follows the film's screenplay, and it uses nearly all of the film's music. Both the MUNY and RSC adaptations were successes and have been revived numerous times in the US and UK.

The Wizard of Oz is Andrew Lloyd Webber's 18th musical. Tim Rice first collaborated with Lloyd Webber in 1965, together writing The Likes of Us. Their next piece was Joseph and the Amazing Technicolor Dreamcoat, followed by two more concept albums that became hit musicals, Jesus Christ Superstar (1971) and Evita (1978). Except for a special collaboration for Queen Elizabeth's 60th birthday celebration, the musical Cricket in 1986, after Evita, each man turned to other collaborators to produce further well-known musical theatre works.

To create the new musical, Lloyd Webber and director Jeremy Sams adapted the 1939 film's screenplay, and Rice and Lloyd Webber added several new songs to the film's score.

Production history

London (2011-12) 
After previews beginning 7 February, the musical opened in the West End, at the London Palladium, on 1 March 2011.  The role of Dorothy was originated by Danielle Hope, who was selected through the reality television show Over the Rainbow, and the title role of the Wizard was created by Michael Crawford. Over the Rainbow runner-up Sophie Evans performed the role of Dorothy on Tuesday evenings and when Hope was ill or on holiday. Hannah Waddingham originated the role of the Wicked Witch of the West and was replaced in September 2011 by her understudy, Marianne Benedict. Hope and Crawford left the production on 5 February 2012. Evans replaced Hope in the role of Dorothy full-time in February 2012, and Russell Grant took over soon afterwards as The Wizard, for 14 weeks. Des O'Connor portrayed The Wizard from May 2012 until the production closed.

The musical was produced by Lloyd Webber and Bill Kenwright, with direction by Jeremy Sams, choreography by Arlene Phillips and sets and costumes by Robert Jones. It took in pre-opening sales of £10 million. The production celebrated its 500th performance on 9 May 2012 and closed on 2 September 2012.

Toronto and North American tour (2012-14) 
An autumn 2012 reality TV show, Over the Rainbow, hosted by Daryn Jones, searched for a Canadian girl to play the role of Dorothy in a Toronto staging by Mirvish Productions. On 5 November 2012, viewers of the show chose Danielle Wade, a 20-year-old University of Windsor acting major, to play the role, with Stephanie La Rochelle as 1st runner up. The production premiered on 20 December 2012 at the Ed Mirvish Theatre with an official opening on 13 January 2013.  Besides Wade, the all-Canadian cast also included Cedric Smith as Professor Marvel/the Wizard, Lisa Horner as Miss Gulch/The Wicked Witch of the West, Mike Jackson as the Tin Man, Lee MacDougall as the Cowardly Lion, Jamie McKnight as the Scarecrow and Robin Evan Willis as Glinda. The production concluded its run on 18 August 2013, having been seen by over 500,000 people.

The musical received a North American tour beginning on 10 September 2013 at the Smith Center for the Performing Arts in Las Vegas, Nevada, with the original Canadian cast, except that Jacquelyn Piro Donovan played Miss Gulch/The Wicked Witch of the West. It concluded on 29 June 2014 at the Detroit Opera House.

Australian tour (2017–2018) 
The musical began touring Australia beginning 4 November 2017 at the Lyric Theatre, Queensland Performing Arts Centre in Brisbane, Queensland, followed by a season at the Capitol Theatre, Sydney in Sydney from 30 December 2017. The cast included Anthony Warlow as the Wizard, Lucy Durack as Glinda the Good Witch, Jemma Rix as the Wicked Witch of the West, and Samantha Dodemaide as Dorothy. Durack and Rix previously portrayed Glinda and Elphaba respectively in the Australian production of Wicked.

Leicester (2022–2023) 
The musical was scheduled to make its UK regional premiere in a new production directed by Nikolai Foster at the Curve, Leicester over the Christmas 2020 season. However, due to the COVID-19 pandemic the production was postponed to the Christmas 2021 season before being postponed again to the Christmas 2022 season. The cast includes Georgina Onuorah as Dorothy with Jonny Fines as the Scarecrow, Paul French as the Tin Man, Giovanni Spanó as The Lion, Ben Thompson controlling the puppet of Toto, Christina Bianco as Glinda the Good Witch and Charlotte Jaconelli as the Wicked Witch of The West.

London revival and UK tour (2023-24) 
On 1 December 2022, it was announced that the Leicester production will transfer to London's West End at the London Palladium (where the original 2011 production also ran) for a limited season from 23 June to 3 September 2023. It will be produced by Michael Harrison, starring Jason Manford as the Cowardly Lion, Ashley Banjo as the Tin Man and Gary Wilmot as Professor Marvel / The Wizard. It was also announced that the production will tour the UK and Ireland beginning at the Liverpool Empire Theatre from 13 December 2023.

Plot
Act I
Orphaned teenager Dorothy Gale lives on a farm in Kansas with her Aunt Em, Uncle Henry and dog Toto, but feels misunderstood ("Nobody Understands Me"). The unpleasant Miss Gulch threatens to call the sheriff after Toto bites her leg. Dorothy wants to escape to a nicer place, somewhere ("Over the Rainbow"). She runs away from the farm and meets Professor Marvel, who tells her all about ("The Wonders of the World"). They are interrupted by a twister, and Dorothy runs home for shelter. Inside the farmhouse, she bangs her head on the bedside. The house is blown away by the storm.

Landing in Oz, Dorothy's house flattens the Wicked Witch of the East. Glinda, the Good Witch of the North, greets Dorothy and tells her where she is. Glinda calls for the Munchkins to ("Come Out").  These little people, overjoyed at the demise of their wicked tormentor, welcome Dorothy and Toto ("Ding Dong the Witch is Dead"; "We Welcome You to Munchkin Land"). Glinda presents Dorothy with the magic ruby slippers that belonged to the dead witch. This enrages the witch's sister, the Wicked Witch of the West. Glinda tells Dorothy that the Wizard of Oz might be able to help her return home, and how to find him ("Follow the Yellow Brick Road"). Dorothy sets off toward the Emerald City to speak to the great Oz ("You're Off to See the Wizard").

On her way, she meets the Scarecrow, who feels inadequate with a head full of only stuffing ("If I Only Had a Brain"). Dorothy invites him to travel with her, hoping the Wizard can help him ("We're Off to See the Wizard"). They soon meet the Tin Man, who is unhappy with his empty tin chest ("If I Only Had a Heart") and invite him to join them. The Wicked Witch of the West threatens to light the Scarecrow on fire unless Dorothy gives her the ruby slippers; Dorothy refuses. In the dark forest, they encounter a very unhappy Lion, afraid of his own tail ("If I Only Had the Nerve"). He too joins the group on the road to the Emerald City.

Emerging into the light, the friends encounter another obstacle. The Wicked Witch has cast a spell creating a huge field of poppies that puts Dorothy and the Lion to sleep. Glinda counters with a snowfall that nullifies the poison, so the friends may continue on their journey ("Optimistic Voices"). Arriving at the Emerald City, Dorothy and company persuade the gatekeeper to admit them. They are welcomed with open arms and are groomed in preparation for a meeting with the Wizard ("The Merry Old Land of Oz"). The Wicked Witch flies down into the city with more threats, still angry that she doesn't have the ruby slippers. The four friends and Toto go into the Wizard's chamber. The great Oz appears as a frightening, disembodied head and says he will grant the group their wishes if they do something for him first. He demands: ("Bring Me the Broomstick") of the Wicked Witch of the West.

Act II
In a forest on the way to the castle of the Wicked Witch of the West, the group try to figure out how to steal the broomstick ("We Went to See the Wizard"). They hide from a group of the Witch's Winkies ("March of the Winkies"). Meanwhile, in her castle, the Witch sends her flying monkeys to capture Dorothy and Toto and bring them to the castle ("Red Shoes Blues"). She imprisons Dorothy and tells her to give up the slippers within the hour or die ("Red Shoes Blues" (reprise)). Dorothy wishes more than ever that she was back at home ("Over the Rainbow" (reprise)). The Scarecrow, Tin Man and Lion consider how to rescue her from the Witch's castle ("If We Only Had a Plan"). They disguise themselves as Winkies and sneak into the castle ("March of the Winkies" (reprise)). They find the Witch and Dorothy. When the Witch tries to attack the Scarecrow, a Winkie hands Dorothy a bucket of water, which she throws over the Witch, melting her. The Winkies are thrilled to be free of the wicked witch ("Hail – Hail! The Witch is Dead").

Dorothy and her friends return with the broomstick to see the Wizard. Toto reveals that the Wizard's fearsome visage is an illusion; he is just an ordinary man. Still, he gives the Scarecrow, Tin Man and Lion tokens of the brains, heart and courage that they already had inside of them. He tells Dorothy that he himself will take her to Kansas in his hot air balloon, appointing the Scarecrow as prime minister of Oz, with the Tin Man and Lion as other ministers ("You Went to See the Wizard"). Just before the balloon flies off, Toto runs into the crowd, and Dorothy retrieves him, missing her ride; she is seemingly stranded in Oz. Glinda appears to tell her that she and Toto had the power to return home all along ("Already Home"). After saying goodbye to her friends, Dorothy clicks her heels together three times, chanting ("There's No Place Like Home").

Back in Kansas, Aunt Em and Uncle Henry tell Dorothy that she hit her head and had been unconscious for days. Dorothy insists her adventure in Oz was real, not a dream, but she is very grateful to be home. As Aunt Em and Uncle Henry leave her alone in her bedroom to rest, a gust of wind blows open her cupboard door, revealing the ruby slippers.

Cast and characters

Toto, Dorothy's dog, was played by four different West Highland White Terriers in the Original West End production.

Notable replacements

West End (2011-12) 
 Dorothy: Sophie Evans
 Professor Marvel/The Wizard: Russell Grant, Des O'Connor

Musical numbers

Music 
Most of the musical's songs are taken from the 1939 film and were written by Harold Arlen and E. Y. Harburg. New numbers written by Andrew Lloyd Webber and Tim Rice include a song for Professor Marvel ("The Wonders of the World") and the Wicked Witch of the West ("Red Shoes Blues"), two songs for the Wizard ("Bring Me the Broomstick" and "Farewell to Oz") and another song for Dorothy ("Nobody Understands Me").  A song featured in the film but omitted in the musical is "If I Were King of the Forest." Also not used in this musical was "The Jitterbug".

Act I
 "Overture" – Orchestra and Ensemble
 "Nobody Understands Me"* – Dorothy, Aunt Em, Uncle Henry, Hunk, Hickory, Zeke and Miss Gulch
 "Somewhere Over the Rainbow" – Dorothy
 "The Wonders of the World"* – Professor Marvel
 "The Twister" – Orchestra
 Munchkinland Sequence: "Come Out, Come Out"/"Ding! Dong! The Witch is Dead"/"We Welcome You to Munchkinland" – Glinda, Dorothy and Munchkins
 "Follow the Yellow Brick Road" –  Dorothy, Glinda the Good Witch of the North and Munchkins
 "If I Only Had a Brain"/"We're Off to See the Wizard" – Scarecrow and Dorothy
 "If I Only Had a Heart"/"We're Off to See the Wizard (Reprise 1)" – Tin Man, Scarecrow and Dorothy
 "If I Only Had the Nerve"/"We're Off to See the Wizard (Reprise 2)" – Lion, Tim Man, Scarecrow and Dorothy
 "Optimistic Voices" – Dorothy, Lion, Scarecrow, Tin Man and Ensemble
 "The Merry Old Land of Oz" – Company
 "Bring Me the Broomstick"* – The Wizard, Dorothy, Scarecrow, Tin Man and Lion

Act II
 Entr'acte – Orchestra
 "Haunted Forest (We Went to See the Wizard)"** – Dorothy, Scarecrow, Tin Man and Lion
 "March of the Winkies" – Ensemble
 "Red Shoes Blues"* – The Wicked Witch of the West and Winkies
 "Bacchanalia"*** – Orchestra
 "Red Shoes Blues (Reprise)"* – The Wicked Witch of the West
 "Somewhere Over the Rainbow (Reprise)"** – The Wicked Witch of the West and Dorothy
 "If We Only Had a Plan"** – Lion, Tin Man and Scarecrow
 "March of the Winkies (Reprise)" – Ensemble, Tin Man, Scarecrow and Lion
 "Hail – Hail! The Witch is Dead!" – Ensemble
 "You Went to See the Wizard"** / "Farewell to Oz"* – The Wizard
 "Already Home"* – Glinda, Dorothy and Ensemble
 Finale – Dorothy and Company

*denotes new song by Lloyd Webber and Rice.
**denotes new lyric by Rice.
***denotes new song by Lloyd Webber.

Cast Recording
A cast album, featuring the songs from the original production, was released as a CD and digital download on 9 May 2011.

Reception
Opening night reviews were mixed but generally praised the designs, the special effects and several cast members, especially Waddingham. The Telegraph reviewer, Charles Spencer, rated the production three out of five stars, writing: "Jeremy Sams's production pulls out all the stops, with ingenious designs by Robert Jones that skilfully conjure up both the sepia world of Kansas and the lurid colours of Oz. Dorothy's flight to the enchanted land is thrillingly caught with the help of film effects that wouldn't look out of place on Doctor Who and the story is told with clarity and pace", but added that Hope "offers a thoroughly competent rather than an inspired performance" that "lacks the heart-catching vulnerability of the young Judy Garland". Paul Taylor of The Independent gave the show four out of five stars, commenting: "Jeremy Sams's production is a marvel of beguiling narrative fluency and, with Robert Jones's superb designs, of endlessly witty and spectacular visual invention – from the digitally-enhanced hurricane transition to Oz to the skeletally twisted Gothic palace of the Wicked Witch and her totalitarian, helmeted guards." Henry Hitchings of the London Evening Standard also gave the show four out of five stars, praising Jones's "lavish costumes and lovingly conceived sets. ... The story is lucid and well-paced, though the technological wizardry occasionally obscures its inherent magic. ... Danielle Hope ... makes a winning impression. Her performance combines innocence with easy charm, and her voice soars." Although Michael Billington, the reviewer at The Guardian, felt "blitzkrieged rather than charmed", he gave the production three stars out of five, writing:
"The star of the show is undoubtedly the set and costume designer, Robert Jones. The Kansas cyclone that whisks Dorothy into a dreamworld is evoked through vorticist projections (the work of Jon Driscoll) that betoken chaos in the cosmos. The Yellow Brick Road is on a tilted revolve from inside which poppyfields and labyrinthine forest emerge. The Emerald City is full of steeply inclined walls suggesting a drunkard's vision of the Chrysler Building lobby. And the Wicked Witch of the West inhabits a rotating dungeon that might be a Piranesi nightmare. ...  Of course, there are the songs; it's good to be reminded of such classics as "Over The Rainbow", "We're Off To See The Wizard", and "Follow The Yellow Brick Road". The additions by Lloyd Webber and Rice are also perfectly acceptable. Dorothy is given a good plaintive opening number, and Red Shoes Blues, sung by the Wicked Witch, has a pounding intensity."

The Oxford Times reviewed the production during Evans's first week (in May 2011) replacing the vacationing Hope, calling the show "hugely enjoyable" and commenting of Evans: "Such is her success in the role that it would be hard to imagine anyone could consider they were getting second-best."

Awards and nominations

Original London production

Original Toronto production

See also
 The Wizard of Oz, a 1987 stage adaptation of the 1939 film
 Adaptations of The Wizard of Oz
 Musical selections in The Wizard of Oz

Notes

References 
 Swartz, Mark Evan. Oz Before the Rainbow: L. Frank Baum's 'The Wonderful Wizard of Oz' on Stage and Screen to 1939. The Johns Hopkins University Press, 2000

External links
 Official Site

2011 musicals
Musicals based on films
Musicals based on The Wizard of Oz
West End musicals
The Wizard of Oz (1939 film)
Musicals by Tim Rice
Musicals by Andrew Lloyd Webber and Tim Rice